Confessions of a Sociopathic Social Climber (also known as The Social Climber) is a 2005 television comedy film, based on the novel of the same name by Adele Lang. It was released March 12, 2005 and stars Jennifer Love Hewitt as 28-year-old Katya, an advertising executive more concerned with being a well-known socialite than being a good person. It co-stars Colin Ferguson, Joey Lawrence, Natassia Malthe, Daniel Roebuck and James Kirk.

Plot
Katya Livingston is an ad exec living in San Francisco. Her accountant goes to prison and advises her to keep a journal of all of her expenses as she is sure to be audited. Katya is vain and selfish, trying to keep up with society by wearing designer knock offs and trying to get into all of the hottest clubs. She is best friends with Eliza: a well meaning do-gooder, Ferguson: a gay male escort with self-esteem issues and a long list of ex-boyfriends, and Frangiapani: a woman that has been married several times.

Katya finds out about the Royal Ball, a benefit for Youth Aid International and the biggest social event of the season. It will be thrown by socialite sisters Dove and Fawn Greenstein. She finds out that she has not been invited because of an indiscretion she mistakenly had with Dove Greenstein's husband on their wedding day and then later revealed Dove's real age to a local tabloid. She is desperate to go, especially when she finds out all of her friends are going.

Cast
Jennifer Love Hewitt as Katy “Katya” Livingston
Colin Ferguson as Charles "Chuck" Fitz
Joey Lawrence as Ferguson "Ferg" Smith
Natassia Malthe as Frangiapani "Fran" Lee
Daniel Roebuck as Alex "Lion" Krosgrov
James Kirk as Sebastian
Sonja Bennett as Eliza
Stefanie Von Pfetten as Dove Greenstein
Jennifer Clement as Gatekeeper
David Lewis as Stan
David Richmond-Peck as Teddy
Meshach Peters as Sabelo 
Preston Cook as Bob
Mike Viala as Steve
Zak Santiago as Geoffrey

Reception
CineMagazine rated the film 2 stars.

References

External links
 

American romantic comedy films
American television films
2005 romantic comedy films
2005 films
2005 television films
Films directed by Dana Lustig
2000s American films
2000s English-language films